Carmel Convent High School is a high school in Mancherial. The school was established in 1972 by the Congregation of Mother of Carmel. It has a present enrollment of more than 3,000 students. It has two boards: the State Board (SSC) and the CBSE.

Campus
The school has a campus of 15 acres. The campus has five separate blocks for various levels of schooling and for administration.

See also
Education in India
List of schools in India

References

External links 

Primary schools in India
High schools and secondary schools in Telangana
Christian schools in Telangana
Adilabad district
Educational institutions established in 1972
1972 establishments in Andhra Pradesh